Trigonodes cephise is a moth of the family Noctuidae first described by Pieter Cramer in 1779. It is found from the Indo-Australian tropics to northern Australia, the Caroline Islands, Samoa and New Caledonia, Nias and other islands on the south-west of Sumatra.

The larvae feed on Vigna species, including Vigna marina.

Subspecies
Trigonodes cephise cephise
Trigonodes cephise saina (Nias and other islands on the south-west of Sumatra)

References

Catocalinae